100 Mile House Regional Transit System provides transit services in the Cariboo of British Columbia to 100 Mile House and communities north of 100 Mile House. The system is served by community shuttle-type buses from Monday to Friday.

Routes

Scheduled services 

In addition to services provided by the 100 Mile House Regional Transit System, the Ashcroft-Cache Creek-Clinton Transit System provides once-monthly on-request service to 100 Mile House.

Paratransit

HandyDart service is offered from Monday to Friday during the day. On Thursdays, rural request-based transit services extend to an area including Lac la Hache.

BC Transit Health Connections

100 Mile House is served by two Health Connections routes, one from 100 Mile House to Williams Lake three times a week, and one in the opposite rotation from Williams Lake to Kamloops on the same days.

References

Transit agencies in British Columbia